Shannon Rangers is a North Kerry Divisional Gaelic football team in County Kerry, Ireland, based around the Shannon Estuary.

Member clubs
 Asdee
 Ballydonoghue
Ballyduff
Ballylongford
Beale
Tarbert

History 

The Shannon Rangers club was formed in 1940. Notable past players include Denis Walsh, Tom Lawlor, Pat Holly and Michael Bambury

Achievements
 Munster Senior Club Football Championship Winners 1965 
 Kerry Senior Football Championship Winners 1942, 1945, 1964, 1972, 1977  Runners-Up 1948, 1953, 1955, 1971, 1974 
 Kerry Under-21 Football Championship Runners-Up 1989, 1993
 Kerry Minor Football Championship Winners 1973, 1974, 1991  Runners-Up 1965, 1997

Notable players
 Shane Enright
 Paudie O'Donoghue
 Denis 'Ogie' Moran
 Eoin 'Bomber' Liston
 Liam O'Flaherty
 JD. O'Connor
 John Bunyan
 Mick Finucane

References 

Gaelic football clubs in County Kerry